Bakavol (also Romanized as Bakāvol; also known as Bakāvol Va Samandeh) is a village in Rivand Rural District, in the Central District of Nishapur County, Razavi Khorasan Province, Iran. At the 2006 census, its population was 463, in 120 families.

See also 

 List of cities, towns and villages in Razavi Khorasan Province

References 

Populated places in Nishapur County